Cowichan was one of the first twelve electoral districts created when British Columbia became a Canadian province in 1871. It was located on southern Vancouver Island. Its last appearance on the husting was in 1920.  It was then superseded by Cowichan-Newcastle, which appeared in provincial elections from 1924 to 1963, after which a revised riding is named Cowichan-Malahat.

Demographics

Geography

History

Notable MLAs 
William Smithe—served as seventh Premier of BC from 1883 to 1887.

Election results 

|-

|Independent
|John Paton Booth
|align="right"|47
|align="right"|23.98%
|align="right"|
|align="right"|unknown

|Independent
|Archibald Dods
|align="right"|38
|align="right"|19.39%
|align="right"|
|align="right"|unknown

|Independent
|Henry Fry
|align="right"|10
|align="right"|5.10%
|align="right"|
|align="right"|unknown

|Independent
|Edwin Pimbury
|align="right"|24
|align="right"|12.24%
|align="right"|
|align="right"|unknown

|Independent
|Thomas J. Skinner
|align="right"|10
|align="right"|9.69%
|align="right"|
|align="right"|unknown

|Independent
|William Smithe 
|align="right"|58
|align="right"|29.59%
|align="right"|
|align="right"|unknown

|}

|-

|- bgcolor="white"
!align="right" colspan=3|Total valid votes
!align="right"|292
!align="right"|100.00%
!align="right"|
|- bgcolor="white"
!align="right" colspan=3|Total rejected ballots
!align="right"|
!align="right"|
!align="right"|
|- bgcolor="white"
!align="right" colspan=3|Turnout
!align="right"|%
!align="right"|
!align="right"|
|}

|-

|- bgcolor="white"
!align="right" colspan=3|Total valid votes
!align="right"|143
!align="right"|100.00%
!align="right"|
|- bgcolor="white"
!align="right" colspan=3|Total rejected ballots
!align="right"|
!align="right"|
!align="right"|
|- bgcolor="white"
!align="right" colspan=3|Turnout
!align="right"|%
!align="right"|
!align="right"|
|- bgcolor="white"
!align="right" colspan=7|1  Reduced to one member from two
|}

|-

|- bgcolor="white"
!align="right" colspan=3|Total valid votes
!align="right"|n/a
!align="right"| -.- %
!align="right"|
|- bgcolor="white"
!align="right" colspan=3|Total rejected ballots
!align="right"|
!align="right"|
!align="right"|
|- bgcolor="white"
!align="right" colspan=3|Turnout
!align="right"|%
!align="right"|
!align="right"|
|- bgcolor="white"
!align="right" colspan=7|2  Reason for byelection was the resignation of William Smithe upon his appointment to the Executive Council (cabinet) January 29, 1883.  Date of election is date of return of writs, as no polling day was required.
|}

|-

|- bgcolor="white"
!align="right" colspan=3|Total valid votes
!align="right"|309
!align="right"|100.00%
!align="right"|
|- bgcolor="white"
!align="right" colspan=3|Total rejected ballots
!align="right"|
!align="right"|
!align="right"|
|- bgcolor="white"
!align="right" colspan=3|Turnout
!align="right"|77.25%
!align="right"|
!align="right"|
|}

|-

|- bgcolor="white"
!align="right" colspan=3|Total valid votes
!align="right"|426
!align="right"|100.00%
!align="right"|
|- bgcolor="white"
!align="right" colspan=3|Total rejected ballots
!align="right"|
!align="right"|
!align="right"|
|- bgcolor="white"
!align="right" colspan=3|Turnout
!align="right"|%
!align="right"|
!align="right"|
|}

7th General Election, 1894

For the 1894 election, the Cowichan area was part of the Cowichan-Alberni electoral district.  It resumed by the name Cowichan the next election after that, in 1898:

|-

|- bgcolor="white"
!align="right" colspan=3|Total valid votes
!align="right"|291
!align="right"|100.00%
!align="right"|
|- bgcolor="white"
!align="right" colspan=3|Total rejected ballots
!align="right"|
!align="right"|
!align="right"|
|- bgcolor="white"
!align="right" colspan=3|Turnout
!align="right"|%
!align="right"|
!align="right"|
|}

|-

|- bgcolor="white"
!align="right" colspan=3|Total valid votes
!align="right"|331
!align="right"|100.00%
!align="right"|
|- bgcolor="white"
!align="right" colspan=3|Total rejected ballots
!align="right"|
!align="right"|
!align="right"|
|- bgcolor="white"
!align="right" colspan=3|Turnout
!align="right"|%
!align="right"|
!align="right"| 
|}

|-

|- bgcolor="white"
!align="right" colspan=3|Total valid votes
!align="right"|440
!align="right"|100.00%
!align="right"|
|- bgcolor="white"
!align="right" colspan=3|Total rejected ballots
!align="right"|
!align="right"|
!align="right"|
|- bgcolor="white"
!align="right" colspan=3|Turnout
!align="right"|%
!align="right"|
!align="right"| 
|}

|-

|- bgcolor="white"
!align="right" colspan=3|Total valid votes
!align="right"|228
!align="right"|100.00%
!align="right"|
|- bgcolor="white"
!align="right" colspan=3|Total rejected ballots
!align="right"|
!align="right"|
!align="right"|
|- bgcolor="white"
!align="right" colspan=3|Turnout
!align="right"|%
!align="right"|
!align="right"|
|}

|-

|- bgcolor="white"
!align="right" colspan=3|Total valid votes
!align="right"|540
!align="right"|100.00%
!align="right"|
|- bgcolor="white"
!align="right" colspan=3|Total rejected ballots
!align="right"|
!align="right"|
!align="right"|
|- bgcolor="white"
!align="right" colspan=3|Turnout
!align="right"|%
!align="right"|
!align="right"|
|}

|-

|- bgcolor="white"
!align="right" colspan=3|Total valid votes
!align="right"|551
!align="right"|100.00%
!align="right"|
|- bgcolor="white"
!align="right" colspan=3|Total rejected ballots
!align="right"|
!align="right"|
!align="right"|
|- bgcolor="white"
!align="right" colspan=3|Turnout
!align="right"|%
!align="right"|
!align="right"|
|}

|-

|Independent
|William Henry Hayward 
|align="right"|539
|align="right"|56.92%
|align="right"|
|align="right"|unknown
|- bgcolor="white"
!align="right" colspan=3|Total valid votes
!align="right"|947
!align="right"|100.00%
!align="right"|
|- bgcolor="white"
!align="right" colspan=3|Total rejected ballots
!align="right"|
!align="right"|
!align="right"|
|- bgcolor="white"
!align="right" colspan=3|Turnout
!align="right"|
!align="right"|
!align="right"|
|}

|-

|Independent
|Kenneth Forrest Duncan
|align="right"|1,145
|align="right"|52.60%
|align="right"|
|align="right"|unknown
|- bgcolor="white"
!align="right" colspan=3|Total valid votes
!align="right"|2,177
!align="right"|100.00%
!align="right"|
|- bgcolor="white"
!align="right" colspan=3|Total rejected ballots
!align="right"|
!align="right"|
!align="right"|
|- bgcolor="white"
!align="right" colspan=3|Turnout
!align="right"|%
!align="right"|
!align="right"|
|}

16th General Election, 1924

In the 1924 election, the Cowichan area became part of the new Cowichan-Newcastle riding.

Sources

Elections BC website - historical election data

Former provincial electoral districts of British Columbia on Vancouver Island